Independiente de Ceutí Fútbol Club, formerly Club de Fútbol Molina, is a football team based in Ceutí, Murcia, Spain. Founded in 2009, the team plays in Regional Preferente, holding home games at the Complejo Deportivo Miguel Indurain.

History
CD Molinense was dissolved in the summer of 2009 and Club de Futbol Molina was founded. The club immediately bought the seat of Archena Atlético, achieving promotion to Tercera División in its first season.

In 2018, CF Molina's place was taken by Independiente de Ceutí Fútbol Club.

Season to season
As CF Molina

As Independiente de Ceutí FC

5 seasons in Tercera División

External links
Official site 
Futbolme team profile 

Football clubs in the Region of Murcia
Association football clubs established in 2009
2009 establishments in Spain